John Edmonds (born July 2, 1951) is an American politician. He served as a Republican member for the 112th district in the Kansas House of Representatives from 1995 to 2006, and again from 2013 to 2016. In 2016, the American Conservative Union gave him a lifetime rating of 75%.

References

1951 births
Living people
Republican Party members of the Kansas House of Representatives
21st-century American politicians
20th-century American politicians
University of Missouri–Kansas City alumni